Cueva de la Olla (cave of the pot) is an archaeological site located in the northwest of the Chihuahua State, some 47 km southwest of Nuevo Casas Grandes near the Ignacio Zaragoza Ejido.

To get there, take the road from Casas Grandes to Colonia Juarez, continue to the Ignacio Zaragoza ejido (dirt road with one way sections). At the exit, go forward two kilometers to the Casa Blanca Ranch, the site is one kilometer from the ranch, the site is perhaps the oldest in Chihuahua and Mexico, the Golondrina Cave is only 400 meters from the site.

The Site is located within the natural shelter of the cave. This site received its name because it has a rounded shape structure, shaped like a pot (or olla, in Spanish). It is a Cuexcomate, or large barn type facility, with a shape that resembles a large vase. Similar granaries were located in scattered caves sites of the Sierra Madre Occidental.

One of the particularities of the Valle de las Cuevas (valley of the caves) is the presence of a site where a sequence of very long human occupation has been detected. Human groups that lived in the region used a maize ancestor variety, dating approximately 5500 BCE.

Due to the cold winter, there was the need to store food, hence they built the barn which can still be seen, although very deteriorated.

The Cultures

Human groups of hunter-gatherers arrive in the region from the north, probably Mogollon, Anasazi or Hohokam, following the Sierra Madre Occidental; used plants, took advantage of smaller animal species, as turkeys; occupied the mountains and gradually dispersed in rivers, developing the Paquimé  culture or "Casas Grandes", whose first settlers were collectors in the process of learning sedentary traits.

Cueva de la Olla belongs to an earlier occupation stage called "Perros Bravos" (Fierce Dogs), from 950 to 1060 CE.

Mogollon ( or ) culture evidences have been found, simple ceramic fragments and other more scarce luxury type materials, characteristic of the Paquime culture. The Site constructors probably were villagers who in addition to intensively exploit the environment, as can be seen in the premises vestiges, cultivated corn, squash, and beans, therefore they established a community use system.

It is presumed that the group living in the Cueva de la Olla was a group of at least 30 individuals, that probably worked the flat land areas of the region, adequate for farming; had water year-round thanks a nearby stream and stored their food production in the barn for a period of at least 170 days. Consumed wild plants such as acorns and palm.

Background
Important evidence exists of northern Mexico settlers, of the Casas Grandes culture, sub-region of the Mogollon culture, that along with the Anasazi and the Hohokam comprise the Oasisamerica area. The northern cultural region is known in Mexico as "Gran Chichimeca" and in United States is called American Southwest.

Sites of culture are located in the State of Chihuahua; Paquimé was the head and commercial center of the region. The first settlements in this culture are dated 1000 BCE, since the late archaic; its apogee occurred between 1261 and 1300 CE, and disappeared in 1450 CE.

The difficult nature of this area shaped the distinctive traits of its inhabitants; who developed from nomadic hunter-gatherers to sedentary, farmed the land and animals.

Sites of the culture are found from the Pacific Ocean coast to the Sierra Madre Occidental, passing through all kinds of ecological and climate environment.

First cultural stage 
The first stage is called "desert", the ancient natives made petroglyphs and cave paintings for ceremonial hunting events. The most representative is Samalayuca.

Second cultural stage
The "Mountain Stage", is part of the cliff houses, on top of canyons. Caves and holes became shelters and housing; it was required to be comfortable in extreme temperatures, and serve as protection against attacks. The main development of this culture occurred in Paquimé, a large commercial city with three story buildings which gave name to the Casas Grandes culture.

In addition to religious testimonies, left important artistic creations, such as their fine ceramic.

The Paquimé culture
The Paquimé culture is classified as part of the Mogollon cultures group, and depending on the sources (United States or Mexican) is part of the Southwest or the North; lately these have been reclassified as Oasisamerica.

The culture reached its apogee in the Casas Grandes region, Chihuahua, México, and in the human settlement known as Paquimé. Through this region passed ancient groups, members of human migrations to the south (México and Centro America) in different epochs, towards 3000 BCE, are the first indications of yuto-aztec groups, which confined the oldest Hohokam settlers to the east and west of the region.

Around 700 CE, began the Paquimé culture in the region, with the introduction of agriculture and semi-underground small adobe houses construction, built on the banks of "Piedras Verdes", "San Pedro" and "San Miguel" rivers, these rivers join to form the Casas Grandes River.

Archaeologist Charles Di Peso, has studied the area, and proposed six stages for the culture development.

Stage I
Pre-ceramic horizon. Its beginning is unknown, concluded between 100 and 200 CE.

Stage II
Undecorated ceramic period. Concluded towards 800 CE.

Stage III
Old period. Concluded around 1100 CE. During this period the first villages were established and its settlers practiced season agriculture, used runoff water from the mountains.

The period subdivides in:

Convent Phase.
Pilón Phase.
During the above phases started the construction of circular homes, built by excavating a circle of less than a meter deep, which served as a base, such housing area were approximately 10 m² and the door round, in the middle of the village stood a community housing larger than the family homes.

Perros Bravos Phase. During this phase increased the size of houses, began building next to each other and the base ceased to be circular by adapting a square shape. Decorated pottery was present in this period, also appear pieces of shell necklaces, small turquoise beads and copper.

Stage IV
Medium period. Finished in 1400 CE. The social organization and city appearance was transformed.

The period is subdivided in:

Buena Fe Phase. Houses are single story and doors are T-shaped and roofs are beam supported.
Paquimé Phase. The culture reaches its greatest splendor, trade relations with other populations increase and ceremonial structures are built. The city is crossed by an irrigation system of channels that provide water, built a ballgame court and began construction of multi-story houses; some constructions had up to four levels.
Diablo Phase. The city was partially abandoned, decline began due to attacks from enemy peoples, towards 1340 CE, the population falls to enemies and many inhabitants are killed, this is ocncluded by the large amounts of human remains found in grotesque postures.

Stage V
Late period. From 1340 to 1660 CE. This period is subdivided in:

Robles Phase.
First sporadic Spaniards contact Phase.

Stage VI
Spaniards period. From 1660 to 1821 CE.

Constructive characteristics

T Doors
T shaped doors. In adobe walls; wider on top and narrower below, small height, barely one meter. According to a theory, the door shape is associated to the prehistoric "cachinas" (ancestors spirits), represented in the United States southwest.

Walls
Construction by a box system. Used molds to pour mud without organic material, compacted. The exterior was stuccoed with sand, lime and oyster dust shells, then it was painted blue, green and pink. Without foundation; the walls were built from slots 25 cm deep. For several levels, the walls below were wider, up to 1.40 m, and 50 cm at higher levels.

Furnaces and ventilation 
Used to control interior temperature. Ventilation was made in the doors, for smoke outflow, these were proportional to the size of the room used.

Stairs and ramps 
Constructed in buildings.

Water system 
"Water retention systems". An irrigation system of channels, on terraces and embankments, took water from rivers, taking it into the city. The rectangular stone slabs channels 30 cm, were used to feed rooms; had a deposit that filtered used water in Temazcal or steam baths. There was also a drain system.

The Site 
It is one of the most characteristic Paquimé culture sites. The complex has seven rooms built inside the cave, with a huge circular barn that from afar seems to be a large dimension pot, which was used to store corn and squash.

For the rooms and barn construction, cast adobe was used, depicts the typical Paquime architecture,  as the "T" shaped doors.

The cave is not very deep; the entrance is about three meters high.

Cuexcomate
This type of barns, similar to others in the highlands, for example Cacaxtla in Tlaxcala, cuexcomates are evidence of structures used for storage of agricultural products, as well as its use for food and human subsistence.

Archaeological evidence exist about peoples who had agriculture and soils and water retention systems.

The Cuexcomate at Cueva de la Olla is important, because of its size (2.5 m in diameter and 3.55 high), as well as by its location in the complex, for community well-being.

The structure is mushroom shaped and was built with dry rolled straw. It is considered that was used to store amaranth seeds, epazote, dasylirion, guaje and others, in quantities sufficient to last 170 days.

Had a red and black coating with native designs, it is thought that they invoked the protection of food and the subsistence of its approximately 30 inhabitants, which conferred it a ceremonial nature.

Has a semi-circular 80 cm opening at the top, probably for ventilation, was covered with palms and carrizo; has holes on the walls to place and withdraw grains. The seed type indicates the agricultural characteristic of its inhabitants. Embedded in the walls are seven clay rooms, in a square. T-shaped doors are almost destroyed, although it is possible to recreate some in its entirety.

It is thought the cave had a residential use and has a small room, inside of another, probably used by some important person.

There are more caves with prehistoric content, including the "Cueva de la Golondrina", located in the same canyon.

See also 
 Mogollon culture
 Oasisamerica

References

External links 
 Nuevo Casas Grandes government 
 Nuevo Casas Grandes Org.  
 The Mogollon: Prehistoric Desert Peoples
 People of the Colorado Plateau
 National Park Service official site
 Firecracker Pueblo 
 The Paquime region 

Archaeological sites in Chihuahua (state)
Mogollon culture
Landmarks in Chihuahua (state)
Tourist attractions in Chihuahua (state)